Tulsa Athletic is an American soccer team and are based in Tulsa, Oklahoma, United States. 2013 was their inaugural season in the National Premier Soccer League (NPSL), which is a national league at the fourth tier of the American soccer pyramid. They compete in the NPSL's Heartland Conference. The team maintains amateur status under NPSL rules, allowing college players to participate without losing their collegiate eligibility. The club currently plays at Athletic Community Field at Hicks Park since the 2022 season, having previously played at Veterans Park (2018–21), LaFortune Stadium (2017) and Drillers Stadium (2013-16), the former home of the Tulsa Drillers baseball team.

Crest and colors
The green that Athletic wears is symbolic of "green country", the moniker given to the area of Oklahoma where Tulsa sits. The gold in the pinstripes that appear on the home kit (and are the dominant color of the away kit) represents trophies, championships, and victory. The crest is a pink shield featuring a unicorn facing a lion surrounding a soccer ball, symbolizing both strength and magic. The pink color of the crest is designed to illustrate the heart. The badge's location over the heart on the jersey signifies that all who wear the crest (players and fans alike) share the same heart.

Support
A supporters group associated with Tulsa Athletic are the Athletics Armory, who congregate behind the north goal at home matches.

Fans have given the team several unofficial nicknames, including "the A's" and "The Foxes", named after 'Lester', a lone fox who resides in the team's stadium.

Rivalries
In 2014 Oklahoma City FC left PDL to join the NPSL, which created an in-state rivalry. The two clubs separated by just 100 miles played in the OK Derby.

The inaugural Red River Cup was contested in May 2014. Four clubs (Fort Worth Vaqueros, Liverpool Warriors, Oklahoma City FC) met in a two-day tournament hosted by Tulsa, who won the title over Oklahoma City FC.

Oklahoma City 1889 FC joined the NPSL in 2021 which resulted in another in-state rivalry, with supporters choosing the name “The War for I-44.”

War for I-44 

 Record: 5-0-1 [W-D-L]; 18 GF-7 GA

Year-by-year

All time Table

Updated as of July 30, 2022

Head coaches 
 Includes all competitive matches: regular season, playoffs, and open cup.

Honors

Club
 NPSL 
National Runners-Up (1): 2021
 NPSL South Region 
 Champions (2): 2021, 2022
 Runners-Up (2): 2014, 2019
 NPSL South-Central Conference 
 Champions (2): 2013, 2014
 NPSL Heartland Conference 
 Champions (3): 2019, 2021, 2022
 Regular Season Shield (2): 2019, 2022
 Red River Cup
 Champions (1): 2014
 UPSL Central Conference-North Division 
 Champions (1): 2020

Individual

References

External links
 

2013 establishments in Oklahoma
Association football clubs established in 2013
National Premier Soccer League teams
Soccer clubs in Oklahoma
Sports in Tulsa, Oklahoma